The 2003 Bassetlaw District Council election took place on 1 May 2003 to elect members of Bassetlaw District Council in Nottinghamshire, England as part of the 2003 United Kingdom local elections. One third of the council was up for election.

Election result

Ward results

Blyth

Carlton

East Markham

East Retford East

East Retford North

Harworth

Rampton

Ranskill

Sturton

Welbeck

Worksop East

Worksop North

Worksop North-East

Worksop North-West

Worksop South

Worksop South-East

References

2002 & 2003 Bassetlaw Election results

2003 English local elections
2003
2000s in Nottinghamshire